Pink Rocket is the second Korean extended play by South Korean girl group Dal Shabet, released April 14, 2011.  "Pink Rocket" was used as the lead single, and the official music video was released on April 13. Promotions for "Pink Rocket" began on April 14 on M! Countdown.

Track listing

Charts and sales

Sales

References

2011 EPs
Dance-pop EPs
Korean-language EPs
Dal Shabet albums